The Democratic Alliance Party is a political party in the Solomon Islands led by Steve Abana.

The DAP supports maintaining the country's alliance with Taiwan.

History

In the 2014 general elections, the party won seven seats, becoming the largest party in Parliament.

References

Political parties in the Solomon Islands